Tempest, in comics, may refer to:

DC Comics:
 Tempest (DC Comics), five DC Comics characters of the same name including:
 Joshua Clay
 Christopher Champion of Atari Force
 Garth (comics)
 Mike Tempest, a character who became involved with the Secret Six
 Margaret "Meg" Tempest, a reporter at the Daily Planet

Marvel Comics:
 Angel Salvadore, who has used the name Angel as well as Tempest
 Tempest, later renamed Flashfire because of the DC character; he was Grannz, a member of the Imperial Guard
 Nicolette Giroux, known as Tempest, who was a member of The Exemplars
 "The Tempest" was a storyline in Ultimate X-Men

Others:
 Tempest, a charity fund-raising one-shot from Alias Enterprises
 The Tempest, a graphic novel adaptation of the Shakespeare play by Self Made Hero
 Tempest (2000 AD), a Judge Dredd spin-off story by Al Ewing

See also
Tempest

References